Too Outrageous! is a 1987 Canadian comedy film directed and written by Richard Benner and starring Craig Russell as Robin Turner, a drag queen. It is based on a story by Margaret Gibson.

Synopsis
A sequel to the 1977 film Outrageous!, Too Outrageous! is about the further adventures of Robin Turner, a gay hairdresser-turned-drag queen nightclub performer.

Recognition
 Nominated for Genie Award for Best Achievement in Overall Sound, 1988.
 Nominated for Canadian Society of Cinematographers Award, best cinematography in a feature film, 1987.

References 
Notes

Bibliography

External links

1987 films
English-language Canadian films
1987 comedy films
Films directed by Richard Benner
Canadian LGBT-related films
Canadian comedy films
LGBT-related comedy films
1987 LGBT-related films
1980s English-language films
1980s Canadian films